The Land War was a period of agrarian unrest in Ireland in the late 19th century. Land War may also refer to:

Ground warfare, military conflict fought on land
New Zealand Wars, also called the Land Wars, between Maori people and colonists 
LandWarNet, United States Army contribution to the Global Information Grid
Land Warrior, United States Army program cancelled in 2007